Regina Dewdney was a provincial electoral district for the Legislative Assembly of Saskatchewan, Canada. This district included the neighbourhoods of Dewdney, Crescent Park, Glenelm Park, Glenelm Park South, Gardiner Park, Arcola East-North Side, Gardiner Heights, Wood Meadows, Glencairn and half of Glencairn Village.

Members of the Legislative Assembly

Election results

|-

 
|NDP
|Kevin Yates
|align="right"|2,558
|align="right"|34.98
|align="right"|-10.51

|- bgcolor="white"
!align="left" colspan=3|Total
!align="right"|7,312
!align="right"|100.00
!align="right"|

|-
 
| style="width: 130px" |NDP
|Kevin Yates
|align="right"|3,821
|align="right"|45.49
|align="right"|-9.59

|- bgcolor="white"
!align="left" colspan=3|Total
!align="right"|8,399
!align="right"|100.00
!align="right"|

|-
 
| style="width: 130px" |NDP
|Kevin Yates
|align="right"|4,153
|align="right"|55.08
|align="right"|+7.96

|- bgcolor="white"
!align="left" colspan=3|Total
!align="right"|7,540
!align="right"|100.00
!align="right"|

|-
 
| style="width: 130px" |NDP
|Kevin Yates
|align="right"|2,687
|align="right"|47.12
|align="right"|-0.64

|Prog. Conservative
|Kristian Eggum
|align="right"|130
|align="right"|2.28
|align="right"|-
|- bgcolor="white"
!align="left" colspan=3|Total
!align="right"|5,702
!align="right"|100.00
!align="right"|

|-
 
| style="width: 130px" |NDP
|Kevin Yates
|align="right"|1,614
|align="right"|47.76
|align="right"|-21.50

|- bgcolor="white"
!align="left" colspan=3|Total
!align="right"|3,379
!align="right"|100.00
!align="right"|

|-
 
| style="width: 130px" |NDP
|Ed Tchorzewski
|align="right"|4,037
|align="right"|69.26
|align="right"|-0.09

 
|Prog. Conservative
|Barry Bonneau
|align="right"|426
|align="right"|7.31
|align="right"|-2.94
|- bgcolor="white"
!align="left" colspan=3|Total
!align="right"|5,829
!align="right"|100.00
!align="right"|

|-
 
| style="width: 130px" |NDP
|Ed Tchorzewski
|align="right"|6,695
|align="right"|69.35
|align="right"|*

 
|Prog. Conservative
|Warne Rhoades
|align="right"|990
|align="right"|10.25
|align="right"|*
|- bgcolor="white"
!align="left" colspan=3|Total
!align="right"|9,654
!align="right"|100.00
!align="right"|

External links 
Website of the Legislative Assembly of Saskatchewan
Saskatchewan Archives Board – Provincial Election Results By Electoral Division

Politics of Regina, Saskatchewan
Former provincial electoral districts of Saskatchewan